The open category was a judo event held as part of the Judo at the 1964 Summer Olympics programme. The weight class allowed judokas of any weight. The competition was held on Friday, October 23, 1964.

Nine judokas from nine nations competed. The final is featured in the Kon Ichikawa film, Tokyo Olympiad.

Medalists

Results

Elimination round

The nine competitors were divided into three pools of three. Each pool played a round-robin tournament, with the winner of the pool advancing to the semifinals. The second-place judoka in each group moved on to a relegation pool, in which the three of them played another round-robin with the winner becoming the fourth semifinalist.

Pool A

Pool B

Pool C

Repechage

Campbell's injury, sustained during his match with Glahn, forced him to retire. Ong took his place in the repechage group. Kaminaga defeated both other judokas to move on to the semifinals.

Repechage pool

Knockout rounds

The remaining four judokas competed in a single elimination bracket. Both losers in the semifinals won bronze medals. Kaminaga, who had advanced through the repechage, defeated Glahn to earn a rematch against Geesink. Geesink, who had defeated the Japanese judoka in the first round, did so again in the final match.

Noted Participants

Campbell would go on to serve in the United States Senate.

Sources

References

External links
 

M999
Judo at the Summer Olympics Men's Openweight